David Harrington (April 4, 1856 – September 20, 1945) was a fireman first class serving in the United States Navy who received the Medal of Honor for bravery.

Biography
Just before midnight August 21, 1884 the  collided with the schooner James S. Lowell about five miles from Vineyard Haven, Rhode Island and started to sink. Harrington remained in the fireroom until the fires were put out by the rising waters and when the water was up to his waist he opened the safety valves. For his actions on that night he received the Medal October 18, 1884.

He died September 20, 1945, and was buried at Arlington National Cemetery, Arlington, Virginia.

Medal of Honor citation
Rank and organization: First Class Fireman, U.S. Navy. Born: 1856, Washington, D.C. Accredited to: Washington, D.C. G.O. No.: 326, 18 October 1884.

Citation:

Served on board the U.S.S. Tallapoosa at the time of the sinking of that vessel, on the night of 21 August 1884. Remaining at his post of duty in the fireroom until the fires were put out by the rising waters, Harrington opened the safety valves when the water was up to his waist.

See also

 List of Medal of Honor recipients during Peacetime

References

External links
 
 
 David Harrington at ArlingtonCemetery.net, an unofficial website

1856 births
1945 deaths
United States Navy Medal of Honor recipients
United States Navy sailors
People from Washington, D.C.
Burials at Arlington National Cemetery
Non-combat recipients of the Medal of Honor